Islam is the second largest religion in Assam. The Muslim population was approximately 10.68 million, constituting over 34.22% of the total population of the state as of the 2011 census, giving Assam the second-largest Muslim percentage in the country after Kashmir Islam reached the region in the 13th century and Muslims are a majority in almost eleven districts of Assam and highly concentrated in four districts.

History 
One of the most important factors contributing to the arrival and spread of Islam in Assam in the pre-colonial times was repeated invasions by Muslim rulers and generals.  Though none of these invasions succeeded in establishing a rule it created a small but thriving Muslim population, aided by local rulers. Later Ahom kings encouraged a small Muslim immigration and even introduced Islamic prayers in court. In the colonial and post-colonial period, the Muslim population exploded in Assam primarily due to immigration.

Early history
One of the first conversions in Assam to Islam was Ali Mech, a Mech chieftain. A Delhi Sultanate general Muhammad bin Bakhtiyar Khalji appeared on the borders of Assam in 1206 and converted Ali Mech who guided him on his expedition to capture Tibet. Khalji had arrived with a force of 10–12,000 horsemen at the Kamrup region, but he was defeated at the Chumbi Valley and was forced to retreat back to Bengal with his army annihilated, where he died in the same year. This expedition resulted in Assam's first Muslim population.

The first immigrant settlement occurred in the middle of the 13th century when Malik Ikhtiyaruddin Yuzbak in 1257 occupied some regions of Assam briefly.  He introduced khutbah and Friday services. However he was soon defeated by Sandhya, the Rai of Kamarupa, who captured and executed him. In circa 1360, the Sultan of Bengal Sikandar Shah raided the Kamata kingdom and heavily weakened King Indranarayan's authority. However, Sikandar was forced to retreat to Bengal, in order to suppress the invasion of Firuz Shah Tughlaq of Delhi.

Sultanate period

In 1498, Sultan Alauddin Husain Shah dispatched military general Shah Ismail Ghazi with 24,000 soldiers and a flotilla to conquer Kamata. The conquest was instigated by Sachipatra, a Brahmin whose son was executed by Nilambar for his promiscuity with the queen. Successfully imprisoning King Nilambar of the Khen dynasty, the Bengal Sultanate began issuing coins bearing the Sultan as the "Conqueror of Kamru and Kamta" and publicly inscribed the victory at a stone in Malda. The Sultan appointed his son, Prince Daniyal, as the governor of the newly conquered region; that reached up to Hajo and intended to expand to Central Assam. 
Ghiasuddin Aulia was a Sufi from Baghdad who arrived after the conquest of Kamata kingdom by Alauddin Husain Shah. He established a khanqah atop the Garurachala Hills in Hajo. Claiming to have brought a lump of soil from Makkah with him, the building came to be known as the Barmaqam Powa-Makkah. Ghiyathuddin died and a mazar (mausoleum) was built there.

A Baro-Bhuyan confederation led by Gandharva Rai's descendant Harup Narayan was successful in removing the Sultanate influence, but the Baro-Bhuyans themselves were removed by Vishwa Singha who established the Koch dynasty in 1515.  The Sultanate rule lasted for about 15 years.

Turko-Afghan soldiers who were taken as prisoners of wars by the Ahom kingdom in the 16th were later assimilated by the local population, but maintained a semblance of their Islamic beliefs and worked as brass metal workers.

Mughal period

In 1613, the Mughal emperor Jahangir appointed Muhammad Zaman Karori of Tehran as the Amil of Sylhet. Zaman took part in Islam Khan I's Assam expedition and was instrumental to the capture of Koch Hajo. The Mughals also ruled Goalpara (as a part of their Bengal Subah), but could not subdue the other parts of Assam. The Mughals established four sarkars in the newly acquired land---among which were Dhekeri (between Sankosh and Manas) and Kamrup (between Manas and Barnadi). Kamrup was also renamed as Shujabad, after Shah Shuja, the Subahdar of Bengal.

In 1630, a Muslim saint from Baghdad popularly known as Azan Faqir settled in Sivasagar. He preached to the local population about Islam and as a result, many converted and became his disciples. His mausoleum is present in Saraguri Chapori.

There were a number of Muslim rulers of Kamrup during this period and they were referred to as the Faujdars of Shujabad. The sixth faujdar, Lutfullah Shirazi, built a hilltop mosque in Koch Hajo in 1657. The mosque contained the mazar (mausoleum) of Prince Ghiyath ad-Din Awliya of Iraq, who is commonly credited for introducing Islam to the region. The Mughals lost Kamrup forever in 1682 after the Battle of Itakhuli.
Incomplete list of Faujdars of Guahati:
Makram Khan (1612-1614)
Mir Sufi (1614-1616)
Shaykh Kamal (1616-1632)
Abd as-Salam (1632-1638)
Noorullah Khan Herati (1638-1656)
Lutfullah Shirazi (1656-1658), built a hilltop mosque in Hajo in 1657.

British Raj
When Assam came under colonial rule, the British brought with them a number of immigrant Bengali settlers (mostly Muslims). These immigrants encouraged other Bengalis to settle in Assam for economic and social reasons. The fertile land of Assam and its vast expanse was inhabited by indigenous populace at that time( that is, vast lands and forests were present but fewer people) which then attracted a large number of landless immigrant peasants from Bengal presidency, nearly 85% of whom were Muslims. The tea planters and immigrant Marwari businessmen, who needed workers, also welcomed the migrants.

Early establishments of these immigrant Bengalis were in the Goalpara district, mostly in the char (riverine) lands and reserved forests. Most of these Muslim immigrants were known as "Miyas". Since many of them came from the Northeast part of Rangpur and very few of them came from Mymensingh, they were sometimes referred to as "Bongya" or Bongali meaning Outsider.

After the Government of India Act 1935, a Legislative Assembly was established in Assam in 1937. The Muslim League, led by Muhammed Saadulah, formed a minority government in the state and he again encouraged large scale immigration from then Bengal.

Independence

 
After the Sylhet referendum in 1947, the Muslim-majority Sylhet region went to East Pakistan while some Muslim-majority areas such as the Karimganj district went to Assam, India.

Assam has some indigenous Muslims like the Gauria, Maria and Deshi, though they are very few as compared to the large-scale Bengal-originating immigrants. Thus, there have been concerns that illegal immigration from neighbouring East Pakistan in India has contributed to a sharp rise in the Muslim population of Assam and has slowly destabilized the native inhabitants of Assam. This fear of "demographic invasion" by East Pakistani has been a political issue in Assam since the days of the Assam Movement (1979–1985). In 2001, there were 6 Muslim-majority districts in the state of Assam. By 2011, this number had increased to 9. However, some have stated these numbers have declined in recent years, though there is no concrete proof.

Assam Movement and accord
The Assam Movement or the Assam Agitation (1979-1985) led by All Assam Students Union (AASU) and the ‘All Assam Gana Sangram Parishad’ (AAGSP) was a popular uprising to drive out the illegal immigrants from Bengal/Bihar etc. The movement ended with the signing of the Assam Accord by leaders of AASU-AAGSP and the Government of India under PM Rajiv Gandhi. During this period of six long years of the historic movement, reportedly, 855 people (later on 860 according to AASU reports) sacrificed their lives in the hope of an "infiltration free Assam" in the 1979-1985 Assam agitation. In addition, the infamous Nellie and Khoirabari massacre also took place during this time claiming the lives of 2,191 and 100-500 respectively.

The Assam Accord (1985) was a Memorandum of Settlement (MoS) signed between representatives of the Government of India and the leaders of the Assam Movement for the indigenous ethnic groups in New Delhi on 15 August 1985. The fundamental aspect of the Assam Accord was: foreigners who came to Assam on or after 25 March 1971, shall continue to be detected; deleted and practical steps shall be taken to expel such foreigners. The indigenous people of Assam (by meaning indigenous is for those who are living since ages even before colonization took place in 1826 as per UN definition of the indigenous people).

Demographics

Assamese is the official language of the state and the most widely spoken, and so it serves as a lingua franca for inter-ethnic communications. Bengali, which is an official language in Assam's Barak Valley, is also a popular common language among certain communities.

The Assamese Muslims are often divided into four subgroups; Deshi, Maria, Gauria and Syeds. Some of these people are descendants of defeated Mughal soldiers, captured in Ahom–Mughal conflicts, who eventually married native Assamese women and adopted Assamese language and culture. Their population totals to roughly 4 million, comprising 12.8% of state population. The Syeds claim to be descendants of the Islamic prophet Muhammad.

The Deshi or Zula are descendants of indigenous converts to Islam from the Koch, Mech, Rabha, Boro. They consider Ali Mech, the 13th-century chief, as their founding father. This group mainly converses in Goalpariya and Rajbanshi, as opposed to Boro and Rabha. They are mainly found in the western districts of Goalpara, Kokrajhar, Dhubri and South Salmara-Mankachar (i.e. Lower Assam).

The Maria are descended from captured Muslim soldiers who were part of Bakhtiyar Khalji's army in 1206. They are named as such because they were engaged in the bell-metal and smithy industry, the word Maria meaning one who hits metals. On the other hand, the Gauria are descendants of Muslim soldiers who accompanied Turbak Khan during his conquest of Assam in 1532. This army hailed from Gaur in Bengal, so are referred to as Gauria. The Mariya and Gauria are minority groups and can be found in Sivasagar, Jorhat, Tinsukia, Golaghat, Kamrup and some other districts in Assam. They speak Assamese language as their own mother tongue.

Muslims from Bengal are the largest majority group in Assam. The Barak Valley is home to native Sylheti speakers. The valley's Karimganj district was historically a part of the District of Sylhet but was separated from it during the Partition of India in 1947. The other two districts of the Barak Valley; Cachar and Hailakandi, were historically a part of the Dimasa Kingdom which also hosted a large Sylheti Muslim population. There also a number of Sylhet-origin Muslims inhabiting the Hojai district. The Miya people are descended from Muslim immigrants from the modern-day Bangladeshi divisions of Mymensingh, Rangpur and Rajshahi. They are concentrated in the central and lower Assam districts such as Dhubri, Morigaon, Goalpara, Hojai, Kamrup, Darrang, Nagaon, Bongaigaon, Barpeta, Hailakandi, Karimganj, South Salmara district, Nalbari, Chirang and Bodoland. Their population is around 10.49 million, comprising about 30% of the state population, out of 40% of the Assam's total Muslim population as of 2021 year estimation report.

The third group are the descendants of Muslim migrants from Uttar Pradesh and Bihar, who speak Hindustani. Their population is about 1.25 lakhs in Assam, comprising 0.4% of state population as of 2011. They are mainly found in Brahmaputra valley.

Human Rights issues
Bengali Muslims in Assam have faced repeated and increased attacks. In 1983, around 3000 Bengali Muslims were killed in the Nellie massacre, (unofficial figures run at more than 10,000).

During the 2012 Assam violence there was communal riot between Bengali-origin Muslims and the indigenous Bodo people. Almost 80 people were killed, most of whom were Bengali Muslims and some Bodos. Nearly, 400,000 people were displaced to migrant camps, most being Muslims. Indian nationalist politicians have accused Bangladesh of trying to expand its territory by ostensibly promoting illegal immigration. However, Indian government census reports note a decline in immigration from Bangladesh between 1971 and 2011.

In Baksa district of Assam, from the night of 1 May 2014 until the early morning hours of 3 May a series of attacks occurred on the Bengali Muslims in Assam, a north-eastern state of India.  The perpetrator is unknown, but is suspected to be the National Democratic Front of Bodoland's Songbijit faction. Speculated to be revenge for not voting for the National Democratic Front in the Lok Sabha elections, the death toll reached 32, mostly Muslims.

On 7 June 2019, 82 families comprising more than 1,000 people — all Muslims — have been evicted from the Rajanikhal forest village under the Haiwaithang range, which interestingly falls inside Barak valley's Forest Minister Parimal Suklabaidya's home constituency Dholai.

On 10 June 2021, nearly 100 families of about 500 Bengali-speaking Muslims were rendered homeless through land eviction, leaving them with no option but to take shelter near a road. A similar drive was also carried out on 17 May at Jamugurihat in North Assam's Sonitpur district which have evicted 25 Muslim families, all belonging to the Bengali speaking groups. The district administration officials said they had illegally occupied government land and did not vacate it despite several warnings in the past.

Many Bengali speaking Muslims in Assam are victim of NRC which, they claim, directly declared them under D voter category. Citing the statistics, the letter alleged that the numbers suggest there was pressure from State authorities to declare more persons as foreigners as far as possible. Between 1985 and 2016, out of 468,934 referrals, 80,194 Bengali speaking Muslims were declared as foreigners. In 2017, 13,434 persons from the same community were declared foreigners. Assam last NRC which was conducted on 2019 year, have found that 1.9 million people names were out of the list, of which nearly around 5 lakhs Bengali speaking Muslims names were excluded.

On 21 September 2021, Assam government have evicted around 5,000 illegal Bengali speaking Muslims in Darrang district and the reason of their eviction is that they have illegal encroached the government lands without any legal documents. It has been also reported that two mosques and a Madrassa were also demolished during the drive. As per as media report, two Muslims (including a kid) were shot to death by the police firing.

On first week of January, 2023, Eviction Drive were again carried out by Assam government in Lakhimpur district, where around 300 Bengali-Muslim Families homes and occupation were destroyed permanently, thus making them homeless and jobless.

Population 

Source: (Census of India) 1901-2021

• Variation for two decades (1971–1991). In 1981, census was not conducted in Assam due to disturbed conditions resulting from insurgency. Muslims in Assam have recorded the most dramatic decline in fertility since NFHS-3, which was conducted 14 years earlier. The number of children who would be born per woman — or the total fertility rate (TFR) — of the Muslim community in Assam is at 2.4 which is higher than the 1.6 for Hindus as of 2019-20 research by the fifth National Family Health Survey. The reduction in fertility among Muslims has been from 3.6 in 2005–06 to 2.4 in 2019–20, a drop of 1.3 compared to 0.4 among Hindus in the same period, although from a lower base. Muslim percentage have increased from 12.4% in 1901 to 34.22% in 2011 (which is a sharp rise of 21.82% for past 120 years). In 2021, some estimates have placed Assam's Muslim population at about 14 million out of 36.54 million total population, making up about 40% of the state population.

Population by district (2011 year)

Below is a breakdown of the Muslim population by district in the Indian state of Assam according to the 2011 Census of India:
 Muslims are majority in eleven districts out of thirty-three in Assam. Muslims are majority in Dhubri, Bongaigaon, Goalpara, Barpeta, Morigaon, South Salmara district, Hojai, Nagaon, Darrang, Karimganj and Hailakandi. Highest concentration in Cachar, Nalbari, Kamrup, Kokrajhar and Chirang.

Trends
Islam was first introduced in Assam by Azan Faqir who have came from Baghdad in 17th century (1601-1700) during the reign of Ahom king Pratap Singha. He preach Islam to local indigenous assamese tribes in various parts of Assam. He played a vital role in unifying the people of the Brahmaputra Valley. He is considered as a legendary Sufi saint who composed many spiritual songs related to Allah in Assamese language. Thousands of devotees from all over the country visit his Dargah at Sivasagar to pay their homage to this great reformer who had done a lot for the people of Assam.

Projections
Muslim population of undivided Assam was 24% in 1951, which increased after Meghalaya, Nagaland, Arunachal and Mizoram were separated from Assam.respectively.  As far as for upcoming 2021 census, it has been estimated that present Muslim population in Assam is over 40%, which have gone up from 35% in comparison to the previous decade of 2011 census respectively. Assam's prominent Professor D.C Nath and B.k Nath have stated that Assam would become a Muslim majority state by 2040. Another Study by Prof. Indrajeet Barua of Guwahati University has also stated that by 2047, Assam would be an absolute Muslim majority state. As per as India facts, Assam will have a Muslim majority by 2061.

Indigenous Assamese Muslims
Recently on 5 June 2022 Assam Government did cabinet decision, indigenous Assamese Muslims only five different sections namely Goria,Moria,Desi,Jalah and Syed,

Illegal immigration
Census of India between (2001-2011) have shown that Bengali Muslim population grows 5-7% in Assam specially in the bordering districts over the past decade. In February 2020, the Assam Minority Development Board announced plans to segregate illegal Bengali Muslim immigrants from the indigenous Muslims of the state, though some have expressed problems in identifying an indigenous Muslim person. According to the board, there are 1.4 crore (14 million) Muslims in the state, of which 10 million are of Bengali origin, and rest are Indian origin indigenous Assamese. Allegedly that the number of 'illegal Bangladeshis' in Assam of all religions is about 1 crore (10 million) and are scattered across the length and breadth of the state. A report reveals that out of total 33 districts in Assam, Bangladeshis dominate almost 15 districts of Assam. Several people reveal that Bangladeshi roumers made them specially Muslims victimized of "D" voters. This is even more problematic when names have been left out even after included on draft NRC by providing proper legacy papers.

Notable Muslims from Assam
 Fakhruddin Ali Ahmed, First Muslim president of India from Assam
 Anwara Taimur, the only woman chief minister of Assam (She was the first Muslim woman Chief Minister of any state in India).
 Mofida Ahmed, Assam's first women MP. (Elected From Jorhat (Lok Sabha constituency) 1957)
 Syed Abdul Malik, writer
 Hafiz Ahmed writer
 Badruddin Ajmal, member of the Indian Parliament from Dhubri Lok Sabha constituency; founder of the Assam United Democratic Front (AUDF), now All India United Democratic Front (AIUDF); president of the Assam State Jamiat Ulema-e-Hind; Industrialist, Businessman and a Social worker.
 Ismail Siddique
 Mafizuddin Ahmed Hazarika, writer
 Adil Hussain, actor
 Wasbir Hussain, journalist
 Baharul Islam, Justice of the Supreme Court of India
 Abdul Matlib Mazumdar, Indian freedom fighter and political leader based in undivided Assam State. He was the most prominent Muslim opponents of the demand for a separate Muslim state of Pakistan, especially in the eastern part of the country.
 Ali Mech, First converted Muslim of Assam
 Abu Nechim, the first  Muslim IPL cricketer from Assam.
 Muhammed Saadulah, the only Assamese Muslim member of the drafting committee of the constituent assembly of India
 Imran Shah, writer
 Parveen Sultana, Padma Bhushan vocalist
 Zerifa Wahid, actor

See also 

 Islam in West Bengal
 Christianity in Assam
Hinduism in Assam

Notes

References

 

 
Islam in India by state or union territory
Religion in Assam